Strazhitsa Municipality is a municipality (obshtina) in Veliko Tarnovo Province, north-central Bulgaria, located mostly in the Danubian Plain but also covering parts of the so-called Fore-Balkan. It is named after its administrative centre – the town of Strazhitsa.

The Hemus motorway is planned to cross the area, connecting the capital city of Sofia with the port of Varna on the Bulgarian Black Sea Coast.

Settlements 

Strazhitsa Municipality includes the following 22 places (towns are shown in bold):

Demography 
The following table shows the change of the population during the last four decades.

See also
Provinces of Bulgaria
Municipalities of Bulgaria
List of cities and towns in Bulgaria

References

External links
 Official website 

Municipalities in Veliko Tarnovo Province